FWU may refer to:

Friedrich Wilhelm University (disambiguation), several universities in Germany and Poland
Fukuoka Women's University, in Fukuoka, Japan

See also
 FWUU, the ICAO code for Mzuzu Airportin Mzuzu, Malawi